The St. Paul University System is a network of Catholic higher education institutions in the Philippines run by the Sisters of St. Paul of Chartres (SPC). 
The System was officially awarded accreditation on March 10, 2004. Administered by the (SPC) Congregation of the Sisters of St. Paul of Chartres (E-1904), it consists of seven campuses around the Philippines, namely St. Paul University Philippines in Tuguegarao City, St. Paul University Manila, St. Paul University Quezon City,  St. Paul University Dumaguete, St. Paul University Iloilo, St. Paul University Surigao and St. Paul College of Ilocos Sur. The St. Paul University System is the first university system recognized by the Commission of Higher Education.

References

 
Catholic universities and colleges in the Philippines
Higher education in the Philippines